The 2017–18 Israeli Premier League, also known as Ligat Winner for sponsorship reasons, was the nineteenth season since its introduction in 1999 and the 76th season of top-tier football in Israel. It begins on 19 August 2017 and ended on 21 May 2018.

Teams

A total of fourteen teams are competing in the league, including twelve sides from the 2016–17 season and two promoted teams from the 2016–17 Liga Leumit.

Hapoel Tel Aviv and  Hapoel Kfar Saba  were relegated to the 2017–18 Liga Leumit after finishing the 2016–17 Israeli Premier League in the bottom two places.

Maccabi Netanya and Hapoel Acre were promoted after finishing the 2016–17 Liga Leumit in the top two places. Both returned to league after one-year absence.

Stadiums and locations

Personnel and sponsorship

Foreign players
The number of foreign players is restricted to six per team, while only five can be registered to a game.

In bold: Players that have been capped for their national team.

Managerial changes

Regular season

Regular season table

Regular season results

Positions by round

Source:

Championship round
Key numbers for pairing determination (number marks position after 26 games)

Championship round table

Championship round results

Positions by round

Source:

Relegation round
Key numbers for pairing determination (number marks position after 26 games)

Relegation round table

Relegation round results

Positions by round

Source:

Season statistics

Top scorers

Source: (Hebrew)

Hat-tricks

Top Assists

Source: (Hebrew)

References

External links
 uefa.com

Israeli Premier League seasons
1
Israel